Chao Anurutha (also spelled Anouruttha or Anurathurat; ; 1737 – 31 December 1819) was the king of Luang Phrabang from 1792 to 1819.

Anurutha was the fourth son of king Inthasom. He was appointed the viceroy (oupahat) of Luang Phrabang in 1768. In 1788, he was taken as hostage to Bangkok together with other royalties. He was not allowed to return until 3 February 1792. After a four-year interregnum, he was crowned in Luang Phrabang by Siamese in 1792. However, he was accused of in treasonous contact with Burmese by the Vientiane king Nanthasen. Rama I permitted Nanthasen to attack Luang Prabang. After the capture of Luang Phrabang, Anurutha was detained in Bangkok. After Chinese intervention, Anurutha was allowed to return to Luang Phrabang in 1796. He died on 31 December 1819.

References

|-

Kings of Luang Phrabang
1737 births
1819 deaths
18th-century Laotian people